Triplophysa daqiaoensis is a species of stone loach in the genus Triplophysa. It is endemic to China and was first discovered in Sichuan. It grows to  TL.

References

D
Freshwater fish of China
Endemic fauna of China
Taxa named by Ding Rui-Hua
Fish described in 1993